Arinia dentifera is a species of small land snails with an operculum, terrestrial gastropod mollusks in the family Diplommatinidae. This species is endemic to Malaysia.  Its natural habitat is subtropical or tropical moist lowland forests. It is threatened by habitat loss.

References

Endemic fauna of Malaysia
Invertebrates of Malaysia
Arinia
Taxonomy articles created by Polbot
Gastropods described in 1996